Rugby Park, also known as The BBSP Stadium Rugby Park for sponsorship reasons, is a football stadium situated in the Scottish town of Kilmarnock. It was first used in 1899 and is the home of Kilmarnock F.C. Rugby Park has also been used for concerts, with Elton John playing to 15,000 in a first for the venue. In 2002, the club constructed the Park Hotel, a 4-star hotel complex next to the ground.

During 1994–95 season the stadium capacity was significantly reduced as a result of the construction of three new stands within the groups which were the Moffat Stand, the Chadwick Stand and the East Stand. The completion of these three stands reduced the capacity of the stadium to 18,128. The renovated stadium opened on 6 August 1995, with a friendly match against Blackburn Rovers F.C. Rugby Park has since undergone recent developments regarding further renovations, with an artificial pitch being installed in the summer of 2014, safe standing available from November 2019 and underground heating installed underneath the pitch in 1999. In August 2010, the West Stand was renamed the Frank Beattie Stand in honour of former player Frank Beattie who captained Kilmarnock to the historic Scottish League Championship victory in 1965.

As well as football matches, Rugby Park has also hosted rugby matches, most recently between Scotland and Georgia in July 2016. The venue has also hosted four international football matches for the Scotland national football team in 1894, 1910 and two most recently in 1997.

History

Early years
 
Kilmarnock played at three other sites (The Grange, Holm Quarry and Ward's Park) in their early years, before the club moved to Rugby Park in December 1877. This was not the precise site of the present stadium, as the field is now covered by Charles Street. The current site was decided by Ross Quigley whom was Kilmarnock's first director.  The grounds were shared by cricket and rugby teams – sports which Kilmarnock had played previously – and the connection with rugby gave the ground its name. Rugby Park hosted its first international match in March 1894, when Scotland won 5–2 against Wales. By this time, the pitch had been moved to its current position. The ground was largely rebuilt and inaugurated with a match against then-champions Celtic on 26 August 1899, when Kilmarnock fought back from a 2–0 deficit to secure a draw. It was their first match in the top tier of Scottish football, having won the Second Division the previous season.

Originally, the ground was constructed with a running track around its edge, a pavilion and a stand along the west side. This layout meant that Rugby Park was similar to Ibrox Park, which opened four months later. The pavilion and stand were linked in 1914, which produced 1,900 seats in a total capacity of 20,000. In 1935 a cover was added to part of the south terrace. This terracing was later dubbed the Johnnie Walker stand, due to the company having an advert on the roof. During the Second World War, the British Army installed large oil storage tanks on the pitch. The club was not compensated, but Italian prisoners of war helped to extend the north terrace. Floodlights were installed and first used in an October 1953 friendly match against Manchester United. A roof was added to the east terrace in 1959, and the West (Main) Stand was renovated during the 1960–61 season. Rugby Park set its record attendance in March 1962, when 35,995 fans saw Kilmarnock lose 4–2 to Rangers in the 1961–62 Scottish Cup. This was a successful era for the club, as they finished runners-up in the league four times and won the league championship in 1964–65.

Renovations
 
Safety regulations cut the capacity of Rugby Park to 17,528 by the 1980s, but this figure was rarely troubled as the club fell to the Second Division. The Taylor Report, published in January 1990, recommended that British stadiums should become all-seater. Around the same time, a new board of directors took control of Kilmarnock. The new board initially proposed to move the club to an out-of-town site besides the A77 road as part of a wider development, but this was rejected by planning restrictions. The board then decided to redevelop Rugby Park.  The last game before reconstruction was played on 7 May 1994, when Kilmarnock beat Rangers 1–0. During the 1994–95 season the capacity was significantly reduced as three new stands were constructed; the Moffat Stand, the Chadwick Stand and the East Stand. Their completion brought the capacity of the stadium to 18,128. The work was completed in just 348 days, as the new stands were first opened for a game against Rangers on 20 April. Kilmarnock officially opened the new Rugby Park on 6 August 1995, in a friendly match against English league champions Blackburn Rovers. Alan Shearer hit a hat-trick as the home team lost 5–0.

On 12 May 1998 Rugby Park hosted the last Ayrshire Cup final, as Kilmarnock fought back from 0–2 to beat Ayr United 4–2. In the summer of 1999, league regulations meant that Kilmarnock had to install undersoil heating at the ground. On 26 August of that year, Kilmarnock celebrated one hundred years at Rugby Park with a victory over KR Reykjavik in the 1999–2000 UEFA Cup.

Park Hotel

Some work has since been done to increase the revenue created by the ground. In June 2002 the Park Hotel was opened adjacent to the stadium. The hotel was built on the site of Kilmarnock's training pitch and accommodates fifty twin/double bedrooms, a conference centre, a café, bar and restaurant. In November 2004 a new sports bar was opened in the West Stand, sponsored by Foster's Lager.

Recent developments

An artificial playing surface was installed in the summer of 2014. This was later replaced by an artificial hybrid surface during the 2019 close season. In February 2019 Kilmarnock received approval to install a new safe-standing section in areas of the East and Moffat stands. The installation process was completed in early December of that year.

In 2020, plans were unveiled revealing details of plans for further renovations at Rugby Park, creating a new entrance, changing facilities and community resources, including a memorial garden.

Stadium design

Despite becoming a modern, all-seater stadium, a number of features in the design of the stands give it a unique look. All stands bar the West Stand have very little beneath them, as the tea bars and toilets are located under the lowest possible point towards the pitch. The rest of the area underneath is open tarmac, with the steel framework fully exposed. Moreover, the turnstiles for the three newer stands are built into a perimeter wall rather than the stadium itself, and there are very large open air spaces before the stands themselves. Other stadiums have a similar design – for example Tynecastle's Roseburn Stand, although there is considerably less space there. One advantage is that since the public smoking ban has come into force it has been possible for fans to stand in the open areas at half-time for a cigarette.

The East Stand is distinctive in appearance as it does not cover the full length of the pitch, tapering before ending around 15yds before the extremity of the pitch. This is because the ground behind the stand is residential, and can not be built on. However, the gap is not as large as a similar truncation at Fir Park, for example, and is filled by flags.

Disabled supporters are accommodated in an enclosures at the front of both end stands.

Other uses

Rugby Union
Scotland have played two games at Rugby Park; against Tonga in November 2014 and Georgia on 26 November 2016. The match against Tonga was the first rugby union international match featuring a tier 1 nation to be played on artificial surface.

Use in film

In August 1999, Rugby Park was used for a fictitious Scottish Cup semi-final in the Robert Duvall film A Shot at Glory. The film also starred former Kilmarnock striker Ally McCoist.

Concert tours

Rugby Park has also been used as a venue concert for several musical artists.

 Singer Rod Stewart performed live at Rugby Park in 2016
 Elton John performed live at Rugby Park in June 2005

International matches at Rugby Park

Four Scottish international matches have been staged at Rugby Park. Normally, Scotland international matches are played at Hampden Park, but two matches were played at Rugby Park while the south stand at Hampden was being rebuilt. During the 1997 match against Wales, Kilmarnock were able to parade the Scottish Cup at half time, having captured the trophy at Ibrox on the previous Saturday.

See also
 List of football stadiums in Scotland

References 

 Sources

External links

Stadium Tours at Kilmarnock Football Club official website
Rugbypark.co.uk (not associated with Kilmarnock Football Club)
Rugby Park at KillieFC.com

Kilmarnock F.C.
Football venues in Scotland
Scottish Premier League venues
Buildings and structures in Kilmarnock
Scottish Football League venues
Scottish Professional Football League venues
Scotland national football team venues
Sports venues completed in 1899
1899 establishments in Scotland
Sports venues in East Ayrshire